Neomicropteryx nipponensis is a species of moth belonging to the family Micropterigidae. It was described by Syuti Issiki in 1931. It is known from Japan.

The length of the forewings is 5.1-5.9 mm for males and 4.9-5.9 mm for females.

References

External links
Mesodermal organogenesis in the embryo of the primitive moth, Neomicropteryx nipponensis Issiki (Lepidoptera, Micropterygidae)
Ovarian Structure of a Zeuglopteran Moth, Neomicropteryx nipponensis Issiki (Lepidoptera, Micropterigidae)

Micropterigidae
Moths described in 1931
Moths of Japan